Iranian Russians or Persian Russians are Iranians in the Russian Federation, and are Russian citizens or permanent residents of (partial) Iranian national background.

Iranians have a long history within what is modern-day Russia, stretching back millennia to the Scythia and beyond. With their historical core in southern Dagestan and the pivotal Iranian town of Derbent, the territory remained, intermittently, in Iranian hands encompassed for many centuries until 1813, resulting in a steady flow and settling of people from mainland Iran. There are two historically Iranian communities in Russia; the Tats, who are amongst the native inhabitants of the North Caucasus, and the Mountain Jews, who descend from Persian Jews from Iran.

Historical context

People from the former and contemporary boundaries of Iran have a long history in the territory of what is modern-day Russia, stretching back thousands of years. Throughout history, the Caucasus region was usually incorporated into the Iranian world, and large parts of it were ruled by empires based in modern-day Iran for a time span encompassing many centuries, or were under its direct influence. From the early 16th century up to including the early 19th century, Transcaucasia and a part of the North Caucasus (namely Dagestan), were ruled by the successive Safavid, Afsharid, and Qajar dynasties of Iran, and made up part of the latters concept for centuries. In the course of the 19th century, by the Treaty of Gulistan of 1813 and the Treaty of Turkmenchay of 1828, Iran ceded the region to Russia.

The Tats are amongst the native inhabitants of the Northern Caucasus and descent from Iranian settlers from during the Sasanian Empire.

Iranian settling in Derbent, Dagestan

A traditionally and historically Iranian city, the first intensive settlement in the Derbent area dates from the 8th century BCE; the site was intermittently controlled by the Persian monarchs, starting from the 6th century BCE. The modern name is a Persian word (دربند Darband) meaning "gateway", which came into use in the end of the 5th or the beginning of the 6th century CE, when the city was re-established by Kavadh I of the Sassanid dynasty of Persia, however, Derbent was probably already into the Sasanian sphere of influence as a result of the victory over the Parthians and the conquest of Caucasian Albania by Shapur I, the first shah of the Sassanid Persians. In the 5th century Derbent also functioned as a border fortress and the seat of a Sassanid marzban.

As mentioned by the Encyclopedia Iranica, ancient Iranian language elements were absorbed into the everyday speech of the population of Dagestan and Derbent especially during the Sassanian era, and many remain current. In fact, a deliberate policy of “Persianizing” Derbent and the eastern Caucasus in general can be traced over many centuries, from Khosrow I to the Safavid shahs Ismail I, and ʿAbbās the Great. According to the account in the later "Darband-nāma", after construction of the fortifications Khosrow I “moved much folk here from Persia”, relocating about 3,000 families from the interior of Persia in the city of Derbent and neighboring villages. This account seems to be corroborated by the Spanish Arab Ḥamīd Moḥammad Ḡarnāṭī, who reported in 1130 that Derbent was populated by many ethnic groups, including a large Persian-speaking population.

Derbent remained a pivotal Iranian town until it was ceded in 1813 per the Gulistan treaty. The native Tat Persian community of Derbent and surroundings, who descend from Iranian migrations from what is modern-day Iran, has severely dwindled since the late 19th century due to assimilation, absorption, and migrations back to Iran (as well as to neighboring Azerbaijan).
 
In the 1886 population counting of the Dagestan Oblast, of the 15,265 inhabitants Derbent had, 8,994 (58,9%) were of Iranian descent thus comprising an absolute majority in the town.

Migration and settlement from the Safavid era up to including the end of the Russian Empire
In 1509, 500 Karamanli Turkic families from Tabriz settled in Derbent. An unknown number of Turkic-speakers from the Kurchi tribe were resettled her in 1540. Half a century later, 400 more families of the Turkic-speaking Bayat clan were relocated to Derbent on the orders of Abbas I. Finally, in 1741, Nadir Shah relocated Turkic-speakers from the Mikri clan to Derbent.

Such assimilation notably affected not only Turkic-speaking peoples of Dagestan. In the past, southern Dagestan had a large Tat (Persian) population which originally spoke an Iranian language (a dialect of Persian) like other Tats, and are amongst the native inhabitants of the Caucasus who migrated from modern-day Iran. In 1866, they numbered 2,500 people and by 1929 lived in seven villages, including Zidyan, Bilgadi, Verkhny Chalgan, and Rukel. However, by the beginning of the 20th century most of them had become Azeri-speaking and assumed Azeri identity in the later decades.

The population of maritime Caspian regions has historically had strong economic ties with the city of Astrakhan on the northern Caspian shore. In particular, Azeris, known to the local population as Persians or Shamakhy Tatars, were represented in the city already in 1879, when there was about a thousand of them. The community grew in the Soviet times and in 2010 consisted of 5,737 people, making Azeris the fourth largest ethnicity in the oblast and 1,31% of its total population.

As the Encyclopædia Iranica states, the number of Persians in the Russian empire or its territories increased steadily in the second half of the 19th century following the forced ceding of the Caucasus of Qajar Iran to Russia several decades earlier by the Treaty of Gulistan of 1813 and the Treaty of Turkmenchay of 1828. These migrants  consisted primarily from Persia’s northern provinces (chiefly Iranian Azerbaijan), who traveled to the Caucasus and, to some extent, to Central Asia in search of employment. Although the bulk of migrants were involved in some form of short-term or circular migration, many stayed in Russia for longer periods or even settled there.

The first traces of migration were recorded as early as 1855. The British consul in Tabrīz, K. E. Abbott, reported more than 3,000 passes issued by the Russian consulate in two months alone. However, the process gathered pace after the 1880s, and by the turn of the century it had achieved a scale and consistency that was sufficient to win the attention of many scholars, travelers, and commentators of the time.

According to the returns from the first national census of Russia of 1897, and cited by the Encyclopædia Iranica, some 74,000 Persian subjects were enumerated in the various parts of the empire as of 28 January 1897. Of these roughly 28 percent (21,000) were females. The largest single grouping was in the Caucasus region, which accounted for 82 percent of the total. As the census states, within the region the four major towns of Baku, Elisavetpol (Ganja), Erivan, and Tbilisi accounted for as many as 53,000 or about 72 percent of all Persians in the whole empire. Next to Caucasus in numbers of Persian residents was Central Asia, where numbers surpassed 10,000. According to the same [1897 census] source, Persian-speakers (as distinct from Persian subjects) numbered only about 32,000, suggesting the predominance of Azeri-speaking Azerbaijanis among the migrants.

Gender Composition and Geographic distribution of Persian-Speaking and Persian Subjects in the Caucasus (1897)

There are many travelers’ accounts and political memoirs that attest to the importance of the numbers involved, but they are often considered to be contradictory or incomparable. Ethner notes that further useful information is, however, available from data on passports and visas issued at the Russian consulates in Tabriz, Mashhad, Rasht, and Astarabad. These data reinforce a picture of consistently rising numbers of Persian travelers to Russia, averaging about 13,000 per year for the period 1876-1890 and rising to over 67,000 at the turn of the century. By 1913 over a quarter of a million Persians (274,555) were reported to have entered Russia. However, this excludes illegal migration, which by many accounts was also substantial. Equally large numbers of Persians were reported to have left Russia each year (e.g., 213,373 in 1913). As Hakimian further states, it has been estimated that net immigration to Russian territories amounted to about 25,000 each year on average between 1900-13. The total number of Persians in Russia before World War I is thus likely to have been about half a million (Hakimian, 1990, pp. 49–50).

According to other accounts too, the politicization of Persian workers in Russia was extensive during a period beset by revolutionary turmoil in both countries. In the 1906 strike in the copper mines and plants of Alaverdi in Armenia about 2,500 Persian Azerbaijanis were believed to constitute the core of strikers. This politicization was also reflected in the forcible extraditions of 1905 referred to above, as note d by Belova.

Persians also took part in political activities between World War I and the October Revolution. In 1914, as Chaqueri states, workers residing in Baku took part in street demonstrations against the outbreak of war. Soon after the October Revolution, a group of Persian workers in Baku founded the party ʿEdālat, which was to become the Communist Party of Persia in 1920.

Soviet era

Present day

Historical Iranian communities in Russia

Tats

The Tats are amongst the native inhabitants of Dagestan. They are a Persian people and are descendants of settlers from modern-day Iran. They speak a dialect of Persian.

Mountain Jews

Mountain Jews are descendants of Persian Jews from Iran, who migrated to the North Caucasus and parts of Transcaucasia. In Russia, they inhabit Chechnya, Kabardino-Balkaria, and Krasnodar Krai.

Notable Iranians in Russia and Russians of Iranian descent
 Fazil Iskander, writer
 Ivan Lazarevich Lazarev, jeweler
 Amanullah Mirza Qajar, military commander
 Presnyakov brothers, writers, playwrights, screenwriters, directors, theatre producers, and actors .
 Hayk Bzhishkyan, military commander 
 Aleksander Reza Qoli Mirza Qajar, military leader, commander of Yekaterinburg (1918)
 Hasan Arfa, military general
 Feyzulla Mirza Qajar, military commander
 Firuz Kazemzadeh, professor emeritus of history at Yale University
 Alexander Kasimovich Kazembek, orientalist, historian, and philologist 
 Sardar Azmoun, footballer
 Habibullah Huseynov, military commander and Hero of the Soviet Union
 Fatma Mukhtarova, Soviet opera singer
 Ivan Galamian, violin teacher
 Freydun Atturaya, physician
 Mirza Abdul'Rahim Talibov Tabrizi, intellectual and social reformer
 Bogdan Saltanov, painter

See also
 Derbent
 Iran-Russia relations
 Azerbaijanis in Russia
 Russians in Iran

References

Sources
 
 N. K. Belova, “Ob Otkhodnichestve iz Severozapadnogo Irana, v Kontse XIX- nachale XX Veka,” Voprosy Istoriĭ 10, 1956, pp. 112–21.
 C. Chaqueri (Ḵ. Šākerī), ed., Asnād-e tārīḵī-e jonbeš-e kārgarī, sosīāl-demokrāsī wa komūnīstī-e Īrān I, Florence, 1969; IV. Āṯār-e Avetīs Solṭānzāda, rev. ed. Tehran and Florence, 1986. Mīrzā Reżā Khan Dāneš, Īrān-e dīrūz, Tehran, 1345 Š./1966.
 M. L. Entner, Russo-Persian Commercial Relations, 1828-1914, The University of Florida Monographs 28, Gainesville, 1965.
 E. Gordon, Persia Revisited, London, 1896.
 H. Hakimian, “Wage, Labor and Migration. Persian Workers in Southern Russia,” IJMES 17/4, 1985, pp. 443–62.
 V. Minorsky, “Dvizhenie persidskikh rabochikh na promysly v Zakavkaze,” Sbornik Konsulskikh Doneseniy (Consular Reports) 3, St. Petersburg, 1905.
 E. Orsolle, La Caucase et la Perse, Paris, 1885.
 A. Seyf, Some Aspects of Economic Development in Iran, 1800-1906, Ph.D. dissertation, Reading University, U.K., 1982.

Further reading
 
 "v. IN CAUCASUS AND CENTRAL ASIA IN THE LATE 19TH AND EARLY 20TH CENTURIES"
 Touraj Atabaki. The State and the Subaltern: Modernization, Society and the State in Turkey and Iran I.B.Tauris, 15 May 2007.  pp 31–52.

Russia
Russia
Ethnic groups in Russia
+
Muslim communities of Russia